Eloy Tizón (born 1964) is a Spanish writer. He was born in Madrid. He has published several novels and short story collections till date. He was nominated for the Premio Herralde in 1995 for his novel Seda salvaje. Velocidad en los jardines, a book of short stories, was chosen by El Pais as one of the most interesting Spanish-language books of the last 25 years.

Tizon is also a writing instructor and literary critic.

References

Spanish male novelists
1964 births
Living people
Spanish male short story writers
Spanish short story writers
Writers from Madrid
20th-century Spanish novelists
21st-century Spanish novelists
20th-century short story writers
21st-century short story writers
20th-century Spanish male writers
21st-century Spanish male writers